Weir Views is a suburb in Melbourne, Victoria, Australia,  west of Melbourne's Central Business District, located within the City of Melton local government area. Weir Views recorded a population of 4,348 at the 2021 census.

The suburb was gazetted by the Office of Geographic Names on 9 February 2017, following a proposal for eleven new suburbs by the City of Melton. The new name officially came into effect in mid-2017.

Prior to the suburb's creation, the area was part of Melton South.

References

External links

Suburbs of Melbourne
Suburbs of the City of Melton